Luca Warrick Daeovie Koleosho (born September 15, 2004) is a professional soccer player who plays as a winger for La Liga club RCD Espanyol and their second team Espanyol B in the Segunda Federación. Born in the United States, he has represented the country at youth international level, although he is also eligible to represent Canada, Italy and Nigeria.

Early life
Koleosho began playing soccer with his local soccer club Trumbull United at the age of 7. Afterwards, he played for the Manhattan Kickers from age 7 to 11. After two trips to Spain with the Kickers, his parents decided to help him develop in Spain. In 2016, he joined the youth academy of Reus, before moving to the Espanyol youth system in 2020. Working his way up their youth sides, he signed his first professional contract with Espanyol on June 2, 2021, keeping him at the club for 3 additional seasons. In 2022, he helped the Espanyol U19 reach the Copa del Rey Juvenil final, where they were defeated by Real Madrid.

Club career
He debuted at the senior level with Espanyol B in the fourth tier Segunda División RFEF during the 2021-22 season. He made his first start on October 8, 2022, and scored his first goal against RCD Mallorca B.

He made his first team debut with Espanyol in a 0–0 La Liga tie with Granada on May 22, 2022, coming as a late substitute in the 90th minute.

International career
Koleosho is eligible to represent the United States, Canada, Nigeria, and Italy, as he was born and raised in the United States to a Nigerian father and an Italian-Canadian mother.

United States
In August 2019, Koleosho appeared with the United States U15 team, making four appearances.
In April 2022, Koleosho was called up to a United States under-20 training camp in Carson, California. After his call-up to Canada's senior side in June 2022, Koleosho confirmed he had not closed the door on representing the United States.

Canada
Koleosho was called up to the Canada senior national team for a friendly and two CONCACAF Nations League matches in June 2022. He departed the camp after the cancellation of the Iran friendly and the subsequent cancellation of the replacement Panama friendly. In September 2022, Koleosho was re-called to Canada ahead of friendlies against Qatar and Uruguay.

Italy 
In March 2023, Koleosho accepted a call-up to the Italy under-19 national team, joining a training camp in preparation to the Elite round of the qualifications to the 2023 UEFA European Under-19 Championship. He was subsequently included in the 20-men squad that took part in the aforementioned round.

Career statistics

Club

References

External links
 
 
 
 
 La Liga Profile

2004 births
Living people
Soccer players from Connecticut
People from Trumbull, Connecticut
Citizens of Canada through descent
Canadian soccer players
American soccer players
United States men's youth international soccer players
Association football wingers
RCD Espanyol footballers
RCD Espanyol B footballers
La Liga players
Segunda Federación players
Canadian expatriate soccer players
Canadian expatriate sportspeople in Spain
American expatriate soccer players
American expatriate sportspeople in Spain
Expatriate footballers in Spain
Canadian sportspeople of Nigerian descent
Canadian people of Italian descent
American sportspeople of Canadian descent
American sportspeople of Nigerian descent
American people of Italian descent